Leonid Gennadyevich Parfyonov (born January 26, 1960, in Cherepovets, Vologda Oblast) is a Russian journalist, news presenter, TV producer and author of many documentary TV shows. Parfyonov is known for his studio work and productions for the NTV (of which he was Producer General between 1997 and 1999). From December 3, 2004, until December 20, 2007, he was an editor-in-chief of Russky Newsweek, Russian edition of Newsweek. From 2012 until 2018, Parfyonov was a member of Presidential Council for Civil Society and Human Rights.

As the author and narrator of the daily culture news TV show  on NTV, Parfyonov produced the line of popular history TV documentaries which he narrated and hosted on-site of almost each event portrayed. The series achieved great success and were repeatedly broadcast for years after premiere.

Career

Selected filmography as narrator and producer
 Namedni 1961–1991: Nasha era (1997) (literally "Recently: Our Era") and 2003 sequel Namedni 1961–2003: Novaya era (literally ("Recently: New Era") are TV series recapping the History of the Soviet Union and modern Russia since 1961 in 42 year-part manner.
 Rossiyskaya imperiya (literally "Russian Empire") (2000–2003) is a similar, but larger-span project dedicated to the History of Russian Empire starting with the Peter the Great rule. The series also used animation and additional narration by famous stage actress Alla Demidova.
 Noveyshaya istoriya. Semnadtsat mgnoveniy 25 let spustia (1998) and Noveyshaya istoriya. Mesto vstrechi, 20 let spustia are commemorative documentaries on the two iconic Soviet TV series:
 Seventeen Moments of Spring
 The Meeting Place Cannot Be Changed, putting the history of the series' creation in the wider social context of both the plot and the production eras. Parfyonov interviewed members and acquaintances of the casts and crews as well as actual police and KGB operatives.
 Russia in Bloom  (2013) – a documentary about Sergey Prokudin-Gorsky, a pioneer in color photography of early 20th-century Russia. Available for public viewing with English subtitles on Vimeo.

2010 political censorship escapade
In November 2010 Parfyonov became the first recipient of the Listyev Prize, in honour of Vladislav Listyev, a Russian TV journalist who was murdered in 1995. On the live-broadcast ceremony for the prize, Parfyonov made an unexpected and emotional speech damning Russian TV community for dependence on the authorities, saying “journalists are not journalists at all but bureaucrats, following the logic of service and submission”. This became a contradiction to the past, when Parfyonov had refrained from making political statements, saying "I am a professional journalist, not a professional revolutionary. My job is to report, not to climb the barricades".

Presence on YouTube
In February 2018, Parfyonov created a YouTube channel named Parfenon, where he publishes his documentaries and runs a weekly blog on "what has happened [to Parfyonov] during the week, what [he] saw, and what [he] thought about" as written in his channel's description. He later revived his TV show Namedni and started discussing the latest news. As of April 2020, his channel has 760 thousand subscribers and almost 50 million views.

Awards
 TEFI award and also a special prize in 2004 – for the "Namedni 1961–2003"
 4 more TEFI awards

References

External links 

 
  Leonid Parfyonov's blog at LiveJournal
  Leonid Parfyonov biography at Peoples.ru

1960 births
20th-century Russian journalists
21st-century Russian journalists
Living people
People from Cherepovets
TV Rain
Saint Petersburg State University alumni
Russian documentary filmmakers
Russian journalists
Russian male voice actors
Russian television personalities
Russian YouTubers
Soviet journalists
Soviet television presenters
Russian activists against the 2022 Russian invasion of Ukraine